Petra Divišová (born 5 June 1984), is a Czech football striker, currently playing for Slavia Prague in the Czech First Division. She was a member of the Czech national team.

Career
After starting her career in TJ Blatná, in 2004 she moved to 1. FC Gerain the German Regionalliga. In April 2007 she made her debut with the Czech national team in a friendly against Switzerland, and that year she signed for Slavia Prague, where she has played for over a decade. There she first played the UEFA Champions League, reaching the quarterfinals.

She is from the village of Radošovice near Strakonice. Because the Czech league is not professional, Divišová works in a rehabilitation centre.

References

1984 births
Living people
Czech women's footballers
Czech Republic women's international footballers
Expatriate women's footballers in Germany
People from Strakonice
Czech expatriate women's footballers
Czech women's futsal players
Women's association football forwards
Czech expatriate sportspeople in Germany
SK Slavia Praha (women) players
Czech Women's First League players
Sportspeople from the South Bohemian Region